The North Fork of Roanoke AVA is an American Viticultural Area located on the eastern slopes of the Allegheny Mountains in the Roanoke and Montgomery counties of Virginia.

Climate 
The North Fork of Roanoke AVA weather is characterized by cool, foggy summer mornings and prevailing westerly winds. The hardiness zone is 7a or 6b depending upon elevation.

Vineyards
 Valhalla Vineyards

References 

American Viticultural Areas
Geography of Montgomery County, Virginia
Geography of Roanoke County, Virginia
Virginia wine
1983 establishments in Virginia